Sin palabras, is a 1969 Mexican telenovela produced by Televisa and originally transmitted by Telesistema Mexicano.

Cast 
 Amparo Rivelles as Chantal Duhamel
 Jorge Barreiro as Adrián Duval
 Carlos Bracho as Pierre Duhamel
 Gregorio Casal as Capitán Christian Von Nacht
 Alicia Montoya -as Elise
 Chela Castro as Catherine
 Javier Ruán as Levin
 María Rubio as Sara
 Martha Zavaleta as Kapo
 Claudia Islas as Nathalie
 Marilú Elizaga as Marie
 Ricardo Mondragón as Mose
 Héctor Sáez as Carlos

References

External links 

Mexican telenovelas
Televisa telenovelas
Spanish-language telenovelas
1969 telenovelas
1969 Mexican television series debuts
1969 Mexican television series endings